Pavis Wood is an area of woodland on a hill located near Hastoe in Tring, north-western Hertfordshire, England. The area is often considered as ancient woodland containing a wide variety of plants such as the yellow pimpernel and wood melick. A bridleway crosses the woodland which can be accessed throughout the year as well as the Ridgeway National Trail which is dominated mainly by beech, oak and ash.

It is linked to Haddington Hill by a high ridge which gives this hill a mere  of relative height.

The summit area is unmarked and is difficult to determine, as is Haddington Hill's summit in Wendover Woods.

References

Hills of Hertfordshire
Chiltern Hills
Highest points of English counties